Sturges Road railway station in Henderson is on the Western Line of the Auckland railway network. It has a park and ride facility available.

History 
The station was opened on 30 April 1934, with other improvements to the Northern Line services.

For many years this station's name was mis-spelt as Sturgess Road. The road was named after a local family living in the area in the 19th century called Sturges, but the incorrect spelling remained in use for many decades until it was corrected in the 1990s.

Services 
Western Line suburban train services, between Swanson and Britomart, are provided by Auckland One Rail on behalf of Auckland Transport .

See also 
 List of Auckland railway stations

References

Rail transport in Auckland
Railway stations in New Zealand
Railway stations opened in 1934
Henderson-Massey Local Board Area
1934 establishments in New Zealand
Buildings and structures in Auckland
West Auckland, New Zealand